Bataan National Park is a protected area of the Philippines located in the mountainous interior of Bataan province in the Central Luzon Region. The park straddles the northern half of Bataan Peninsula near its border with Subic Bay Freeport Zone. The park was first established in 1945 under Proclamation No. 24 with an initial area of 31,000 hectares and included portions of the fenced area of Subic Bay Freeport Zone. The park encompasses the Bataan towns and cities of Hermosa, Orani, Samal, Abucay, Balanga, Bagac and Morong.

Activities in the park include nature viewing, bird watching, and trekking to its several peaks and waterfalls.

Topography and ecology

Bataan National Park is covered by tropical jungle and mountain terrains with significant geological features such as rivers, springs and waterfalls. Pasukulan and Dunsulan falls are found within the park, as are important species of flowers and ground orchids. It is also home to several wild monkeys and other varieties of insects and birds.

References

See also
 Zambales Mountains
 Subic Forest
 List of national parks of the Philippines

National parks of the Philippines
Forests of the Philippines
Protected areas established in 1945
1945 establishments in the Philippines
Geography of Bataan
Tourist attractions in Bataan